Steelheart was the first full-length album by the American glam metal band Steelheart. It was released on July 10, 1990, and re-released with a new cover in 1991. It reached #40 on the Billboard 200. The album was certified Gold by the RIAA in 1991.

Track listing
 "Love Ain't Easy" – 3:41 (Miljenko Matijevic, James Ward)
 "Can't Stop Me Lovin' You" – 5:06 (Matijevic)
 "Like Never Before" – 4:45 (Matijevic, Ward)
 "I'll Never Let You Go" – 5:06 (Matijevic)
 "Everybody Loves Eileen" – 6:20 (Matijevic, Ward)
 "Sheila" – 7:40 (Ward)
 "Gimme Gimme" – 5:23 (Matijevic, Ward)
 "Rock'n Roll (I Just Wanna)" – 4:10 (Matijevic, Ward)
 "She's Gone" – 6:35 (Matijevic)
 "Down n' Dirty" – 6:42 (Matijevic, Ward)

Personnel
 Miljenko Matijevic - vocals
 Chris Risola - lead guitar
 Frank DiCostanzo - rhythm guitar
 James Ward - bass guitar
 John Fowler - drums

Additional personnel
 Zael Ahmad - background vocals
 Yazid Khan - violinist
 Jai Winding - piano on "She's Gone"
 Engineered by Jeff Coppage, Lori Fumar, Clif Norrell and Paul Northfield
 Mixed by Paul Northfield

Charts

Weekly charts

Year-end charts

References

1990 debut albums
Steelheart albums
MCA Records albums
Albums produced by Mark Opitz